SBK-08: Superbike World Championship (known as SBK Superbike World Championship in North America) is the official video game for the 2008 Superbike World Championship season, released for contemporary non-Nintendo platforms, with planned versions for Nintendo's Wii and Nintendo DS systems cancelled for unknown reasons. It features 22 official riders and 12 official race tracks. The European version of the PlayStation 3 release lacked PlayStation trophies support.

See also
MotoGP '08, the contemporary installment of the MotoGP series developed by Milestone for the same platforms, with a Wii version replacing the PSP.

Reception
SBK08 received mixed reviews, with an average of 65% on GameRankings. Its lowest score was 55% from Play, and highest 7/10 from Total PC Gaming.

References

2008 video games
Superbike World Championship video games
PlayStation 2 games
PlayStation 3 games
PlayStation Portable games
Racing video games set in the United States
Sports video games set in Italy
Video games developed in Italy
Xbox 360 games
Cancelled Nintendo DS games
Cancelled Wii games
Windows games
Video games set in Australia
Video games set in the Czech Republic
Video games set in France
Video games set in the Netherlands
Video games set in Qatar
Video games set in Spain
Video games set in the United Kingdom
Multiplayer and single-player video games
Milestone srl games
Black Bean Games games